Ffotogallery is the national development agency for photography in Wales. It was established in 1978 and since June 2019 has been based in Cathays, Cardiff. It also commissions touring exhibitions nationally and internationally. Its current director is David Drake. From 2003 to 2019 Ffotogallery was based in Turner House Gallery in Penarth.

Background

Ffotogallery is a national organisation and has an exhibition programme featuring artists from Wales and the rest of the world. It features touring exhibitions, collaborations with other organisations and galleries, print and online publishing and an education and outreach programme. Ffotogallery also works with film and video, digital media and installation.

In 2003 it acquired Turner House Gallery in Penarth, near Cardiff, from the National Museum of Wales and used it for photography-based exhibitions. In June 2019 it moved from Turner House to Cathays, Cardiff.

Ffotogallery receives regular funding from the Arts Council of Wales, for example receiving £198,688 in 2015/16 and a similar amount in 2016/2017.

Diffusion: Cardiff International Festival of Photography
Ffotogallery organises Diffusion: Cardiff International Festival of Photography. The biannual festival was held in 2013, focusing on Europe, in 2015 when the title was "Looking for America" and in 2017 when under the theme 'Revolution.' The fourth instalment took place in April 2019 with the theme Sound + Vision, exploring the relationship between sound, photography and lens-based media.

Commissions
Major Ffotogallery commissions made in and about Wales over the last three decades include The Valleys Project, A470 and Barrage. These have featured alongside important new work made in single artist projects such as Keith Arnatt, Josef Koudelka, Peter Finnemore, Willie Doherty, Peter Fraser, Wendy McMurdo, John Davies, Catherine Yass and Bedwyr Williams. Many works commissioned by Ffotogallery are now held in national collections in Wales, or have been acquired for British Council and Arts Council collections.

Exhibitions
Some of the exhibitions Ffotogallery has hosted at Turner House include:

 January–February 2004: Urban Dreams, John Davies
 January–February 2008: Niagara, Alec Soth
 August–October 2009: Cockroach Diary and Other Stories, Anna Fox
 March–April 2010: Lost for Words, Peter Fraser
 June–August 2010: Villes/Cities, Raymond Depardon
 January–February 2012: Works ion Memory, Daniel Blaufuks
 July–September 2013: Early Photographic Works, Daniel Meadows
 November 2013–January 2014: Stasis, Trine Søndergaard
 March–May 2014: “Day Dreaming About The Good Times?”, Paul Reas
 February–March 2014 We make the path by walking Paul Gaffney and Clear of People Michal Iwanowski.
 July–August 2014 The Black Hole & Hiraeth. Janire Nájera and Gareth Phillips.
 March–April 2017: Kanu's Gandhi
 June 2017: A Million Mutinies Later, Various
 July–August 2017: The Queen, The Chairman and I
 October–December 2017: Land/Sea, Mike Perry
 January 2018: Still Lives: Consumed, Dawn Woolley

References

External links

Diffusion: Cardiff International Festival of Photography

1978 establishments in Wales
Arts in Cardiff
British photography organisations
Photography in Wales
Photography museums and galleries in Wales